J. R. Ruffin (born July 28, 1982) is a former Canadian football defensive back. He was signed by the Calgary Stampeders as an undrafted free agent in 2006. He played college football at Idaho.

External links

1982 births
Living people
Canadian football defensive backs
Idaho Vandals football players
American players of Canadian football
Calgary Stampeders players
Milwaukee Mustangs (2009–2012) players
BC Lions players
Sportspeople from Detroit